Alberic II was a bishop of Utrecht from 838 to 844.

Alberic was the brother of his predecessor Frederick of Utrecht. Nothing is known about his administration. He was buried in the Saint Salvatorchurch in Utrecht.

References
http://www.dbnl.org/tekst/molh003nieu02_01/molh003nieu02_01_0033.htm

Bishops in the Carolingian Empire
840s deaths
Bishops of Utrecht
Year of birth unknown